Darrin Alexander Winston (July 6, 1966 – August 15, 2008) was an American professional baseball pitcher. He played parts of two seasons in Major League Baseball (MLB), both for the Philadelphia Phillies, and also played in the Montreal Expos and Pittsburgh Pirates minor league organizations. Winston had six children and one grandchild.

Winston was born in Passaic, New Jersey. He lived in Edison, where he attended Bishop George Ahr High School, and moved to Millstone Township in the late 1990s.

Baseball career
He attended Rutgers University where he participated in college baseball. He holds Rutgers career records for victories (26), innings pitched (278) and complete games (22). He was inducted into the Rutgers University Hall of Fame in 2000. In 1987, he played collegiate summer baseball in the Cape Cod Baseball League for the Yarmouth-Dennis Red Sox.

On June 1, 1988, Winston was drafted by the Montreal Expos in the 18th round of the 1988 MLB draft, and he signed with them on June 7 of that season. On October 15, 1994, Winston was granted free agency. On December 8, 1994, he signed as a free agent with the Pittsburgh Pirates. He was again granted free agency on October 15, 1995. On December 20, 1996, Winston signed as a free agent with the New York Mets. He was then released by the Mets on March 31, 1997, before playing a game in their organization. On April 7, 1997, he was signed as a free agent with the Philadelphia Phillies.

Winston made his MLB debut on September 10, 1997, with the Philadelphia Phillies. On the day of his MLB debut, the Phillies were playing against the New York Mets at Shea Stadium, with 13,257 people attending the game. In the bottom of the eighth inning, Winston was called upon to replace Ken Ryan, for whom Kevin Sefcik had pinch-hit in the top of the inning. He pitched one inning, striking out one batter, allowing four earned runs, three hits, and two bases on balls. The Phillies lost to the Mets, 10–2. He played his last major league game on June 25, 1998. After the season, he was not offered a contract, and became a free agent on October 15, 1998. He signed with the Los Angeles Angels of Anaheim on November 18, 1998, but he never played in professional baseball after that.

Death
Winston died in Freehold Township, New Jersey, on August 15, 2008, two days after being diagnosed with leukemia. He died after an exploratory laparotomy to obtain a lymph node and liver biopsy. Winston had a very low white and red blood cell count. He ruptured his spleen, did not have enough cells to fight it, and died at 3:28 a.m.

References

External links

Baseball Almanac
Baseball Prospectus
Career statistics and player information from Korea Baseball Organization

1966 births
2008 deaths
American expatriate baseball players in Canada
American expatriate baseball players in South Korea
Baseball players from New Jersey
St. Thomas Aquinas High School (New Jersey) alumni
Calgary Cannons players
Deaths from cancer in New Jersey
Deaths from leukemia
Harrisburg Senators players
Hanwha Eagles players
Indianapolis Indians players
Jacksonville Expos players
Jamestown Expos players
KBO League pitchers
Major League Baseball pitchers
Ottawa Lynx players
People from Edison, New Jersey
People from Millstone Township, New Jersey
Philadelphia Phillies players
Rockford Expos players
Rutgers Scarlet Knights baseball players
Scranton/Wilkes-Barre Red Barons players
Somerset Patriots players
Sportspeople from Passaic, New Jersey
West Palm Beach Expos players
Yarmouth–Dennis Red Sox players